Stadler may refer to:

Stadler (surname)
Stadler Rail, a Swiss manufacturer of railway rolling stock

See also
Staedtler, a German manufacturing company based in Nuremberg

ru:Штадлер